Anand Balwant Patil (born 1945) is a Marathi and English creative writer, postcolonial, comparatist, culturalist translator –scholar from Maharashtra –Goa, India. Starting with his debut rural novellas and research on the ‘Western Influences on Marathi Drama 1818-1947’ Patil set new trends in rural fiction. His Icchamarn  is the compendious epic novel on a village. It is regarded as a masterpiece of gramin (rural) fiction. He is the recipient of four Government of Maharashtra Awards for extraordinary literary works and also other thirteen literary awards. He is the founder of Aranyanand Shikshan, Sahitya va Sanskriti Pratisthan and Anand Granthsagar Prkashan.

Education 
Patil was born on 3 July 1945 in a remote village in the range of Sahyadri Mountain in Maharashtra. He joined the ‘Earn and Learn’ scheme of Karmveer Bhaurao Patil and received Merit scholarship for M.A. in Entire English from shivaji university Kolhapur, Maharashtra. The UGC Teachership and British council visitorship enabled him to submit the meritorious Ph.D. dissertation which was published both in English and Marathi.

Career
Dr. Patil has contributed immensely in field of education and literature. His contributions are shortly elaborated here.

Teaching
Patil taught English language and Literature in various colleges of Rayat Shikshan Sanstha for 24 years and later comparative Literature and creative writing in Department of English, Goa University and school of Languages and Literature in Swami Ramanand Teerth Marathwada University, Nanded. After retirement he was the visiting Professor of Delhi University, Patan and Nagpur University.

Literary career
Patil’s first short story ‘Khep' published in the most prestigious periodical ‘Satyakatha’(1971) and novella  Kagud in 'Mouji' (1984) earned him the nickname ‘Kagudwala’ Patil given by stalwart fictionist  Shankar Patil. Anand Patil become a name to be conjured with in rural fiction. His autobiographical element and mastery of rural language was so powerful that he was described as a rising sun of Marathi rural writing.

Once after he joined the Goa University as a Reader in English he has reached to the new heights. He reached where Maharashtrian writers have reached seldom including publishing articles in Ariel, comparative and culture studies, Oxford and Cambridge Companions in the Western countries. Patil ventured where no Marathi Marathi writer had ever trod . He was turned down by those so called scholars who had never published a single book in Maharashtra. This cultural tuen made him the leading comparatist and culturalist in India who went abroad for seven times on the academic tours. His book on 'Comparative Literature :Theory and practice' translated in to Hindi is a text book all over India.
Whatever genre he tried he made  his work. For example, his ‘Patalachi Londanvari’ translated in to Kannada and Hindi is considered the first true travel writing of the marginal Indian, and ‘In search of my Kolhapur’ the first travel of a District, ‘Granthani Rachlela Mahapurush’ a first literary biography and so on. As a creative writer he is Ngugi wa Thiong'o of Marathi and as a culturalist –comparatist he is Raymond Williams of India.

Bibliography

Novels
Kagud ani Shavali. Murusai :Mouji,1986
Icchamaran. Aurangabad:Saket, 2008

Short story collection
Phugaaya. Aurangabad:Sket 1994
Dawan. Aurangabad: Sahityaseva. 1998
Suparna vrakshyakhali Bhav dupari. Aurangabad: Rajat 2006
Phera. Pune: Pshpa 2006 
KhandaniPune: Snehwardhan 2011
Shodh Eka chalwalya Mitracha. Kolhapur. Ajab210

Travel Writing
Patalachi Londonwari, Mumbai: Lok wangmay (1993) trams in Kannada by Sathkad and Hindi by Shailesh Pandey
Paradeshi Saha Parikrama. Pune: Suvidhya 2003.
In search of my Kolhapur through Travellers eyes: Amsela Associated Publishers

Literary Biography
Granthani Rachalels Mahapurush: Yashvantrao Chavan. Kolhapur: Anand Granthsagar, 2018.
Maharashtrala Mahit Naslele Samrat Shivaji. Kolhapur: Anand Granthsagar,2018

Drama
Sangeet Automatic Asud. Kolhapur : Anand Granthsager

Translation
P.S. Deshmukh. The Origin and Development of Religion in vedic literature. London Oxford Univ-Press 1933, train in to Marathi Dhrmacha Vaidek Wangmayatil udhay ani vikas: Kolhapur Anand  Granthsagar 2005 
Basavraj Naikar, Light in the House. Trans in to Marathi Urus, Pune: Datta Prakashan 2005

Marathi Comparative and Cultural Studies
Marathi Natakawaril Ingraji Prabhav. Mumbai : Lokwangmay 1993 
Taulanik Sahitya : Nave Siddhhant ani upyojan. Aurangabad :Saket 1998. Translated in to Hindi by Chandrlekha 
British Bombay ani Portuguese Govyateel Wangmay. Mumbai: Granthali1999 
Tulav: Tanlanik Nibandh. Mumbai:ranthali,2002
Sahitya Kahi Deshi Kahi Videsh. Pune: Patmaandha 2004
Tharava. Nagpur Akanksha 2005
Teekavamarsh. Aurngabad : Rajat 2010
Samiksha Up Haran. Aurangabad Rajat 2010
Sahitya vimarsh Maranam . Pune Diamond 2011
Samagra Shakespeare: Taulanik Sanskrti Samiksha. Kolhapur : Anand Granthsager 2017 
Samagra S. S. Mardhekar: Taulanik Sanskrati Mimam  -nsa,Pune: Padmagandha, 2018
Local and Global, Kolhapur Anand Granthsager 2019
Kahi  Lobel kahi Globel Anand Granthsagar 2019

English Comparative Literature and Cultural Studies
Western Influence on Marathi Drama. Panaji Rajhanus. 1993 
Whirligig of Taste: Essays in Comparative Literature Delhi: Creative Books 1999
Perspectives and Progression. Delhi Creative Books 2005
ddhas Shelke: Makers of Indian Literature. New Delhi: Sahitya Academy 2002 
Revisioning Comparative Literature and Culture Delhi: Authors Press 2011
Literary Comparative Literative and Cultural Criticism. Foreworeded by Steehen Tostory de Zeptne. Ambala : Associated Press 2011
Interdisciplinary : Literary and Cultural. Kolhapur: Anand Granthsagar 2019

Literary Awards and Appreciation Received by Patil

Awards
H.N. Apte Award for Kagud ani Savali: Government of Maharashtra H.N. Apte Award ,M.S. Parishad, Pune H.N .Apte Award. Best novel of the Decade Selection by Maharashtra Times (1986) 
Pune Nagar Wachanalay S.J. Joshi Awards, for Icchamaran. Balapur Library Kondaji Patil Purskar (2008) 
SKK Purskar. Taulanik Sahitya: Nave Siddhant ani Uptojan. Government of Maharashtra SKK Purskar.
M.V. Gokhale Award. Marathi Natkawaril Ingraji prbhav, Maharashtra Sahitya Parishad Pune M.V. Gokhale Award (1998) 
S.M. Paranjpe Award. British Bombay ani Portuguese Govyatil Wangmay .Maharashtra Sahitya Parishad Pune S.M. Paranjpe Award 
Tulav: Tulanik Nibandh, Jansahitya parishad Amravati Award and Vidharbh Sahitya Sangh ugawani awards (1999) 
Srajanatamak Lekhan, Government of Maharashtra Kusumavati Deshpande Award 2005 
Teekvastraharan . Govt of Maharashtra SKK Awards and Dakshin Maharashtra Sahitya sabha R. Shahu Award 2008 
Sahitya Vimarsh Maranam. Maharashtra Sahitya Parishad, H. S. Shenolikar Award 2011 
Granthani Rachlela Mahapurush: Yashwantrao Chavan, Vidhrbh Itihas Sanshodhak Mandal, Nagpur, Freedom fighter Balaji Huddar Award. South  Maharashtra Sahitya Sabha Kolhapur Annabhau Sathe Award, Maharashtra Sahitya Parishad Pune Phaltan branch Yashvantrao Chavan Sahitya  Gaurav Purskar. Jaysingpur ,Kavita Sagar Prkashan Rashitriya Award (2017)

Critical Books Published on Patil’s Writings
Patlachi Londonwari: Kahi Drashtikshep ed: Shailesh Tribhuvan (2003) 
Patlachia Phad: Samagra Samikshed . ed. Shrikrishna Asud (2011) 
Anand Parva: Tulanik Sahityaani ani Sanskriti Samiksha, Ed Srikrishan Adsul  (2014)

References

Living people
1945 births
Marathi-language writers
Indian writers
Postmodern writers
Dalit writers